This is a list of the best-selling albums in Canada that have been certified by Music Canada, formerly known as Canadian Recording Industry Association (CRIA).

Album certifications

Music Canada provides "certifications" for album sales, similar to the RIAA's. The certification levels for albums released after May 1, 2008 are:
Gold: 40,000 units (previously 50,000)
Platinum: 80,000 units (previously 100,000)
Diamond: 800,000 units (previously 1,000,000) 

Note: Multi-Platinum certification refers to albums that have sold 160,000 units or more (i.e. 160,000 is double Platinum) but have not yet sold 800,000 units (Diamond certification).

Best-selling albums in Canada

Best-selling albums by year

2010s

See also

The Top 100 Canadian Albums
List of diamond-certified albums in Canada
List of number-one singles (Canada)

References

External links
 Gold and Platinum

Canada, diamond
Canadian music industry
Canadian music-related lists